Donald Karl Schott (born September 13, 1955) is a Wisconsin attorney in private practice and is a former nominee to be a United States circuit judge of the United States Court of Appeals for the Seventh Circuit.

Biography
Schott was born on September 13, 1955, in Lynwood, Los Angeles County, California. He received a Bachelor of Arts degree in 1977 from the University of Wisconsin–Madison. He received a Juris Doctor, cum laude, in 1980 from Harvard Law School. He began his legal career as an associate at the Milwaukee, Wisconsin law firm of Quarles & Brady, from 1980 to 1983. From 1983 to 1985, he served as a legislative liaison for the Office of the Governor before returning to Quarles & Brady at their Madison office as an associate in 1985. He became a partner with the firm in 1987. During his legal career, Schott has represented a number of clients in cases involving a wide range of legal issues including securities regulation, corporate governance, health care, and environmental disputes. He litigates in Federal and State courts at the trial and appellate level. In addition to an active litigation practice, he regularly counsels clients on litigation avoidance. He is active in firm management and leadership, having served on the firm's Executive Committee since 1991, and as the former managing partner of the Madison, Wisconsin office. In 2001, Schott was inducted as a fellow in the American College of Trial Lawyers.

Expired nomination to court of appeals
On January 12, 2016, President Barack Obama nominated Schott to serve as a United States circuit judge of the United States Court of Appeals for the Seventh Circuit, to the seat vacated by Judge Terence T. Evans, who took senior status on January 7, 2010. On May 18, 2016 the Judiciary Committee held a hearing on his nomination. On June 16, 2016 his nomination was reported out of committee by a vote of 13–7. His nomination expired on January 3, 2017, with the end of the 114th Congress.

See also
 Barack Obama judicial appointment controversies

References

1955 births
Living people
20th-century American lawyers
21st-century American lawyers
Harvard Law School alumni
People from Los Angeles
People from Lynwood, California
Lawyers from Milwaukee
University of Wisconsin–Madison alumni
Wisconsin lawyers